337th Regiment may refer to:

 337th Infantry Regiment (United States)
 337th Infantry Regiment (Wehrmacht), part of the 208th Infantry Division in World War II; see Vinkt massacre
 337th Independent Helicopter Regiment, Russian Air Force (formerly Soviet Army)

See also
 337th (disambiguation), for other kinds of military unit known as "The 337th"